Royal Clarence Yard in Gosport, Hampshire, England was established in 1828 as one of the Royal Navy's two principal, purpose built, provincial victualling establishments (the other being Royal William Yard in Plymouth, Devon). It was designed by George Ledwell Taylor, Civil Architect to the Navy Board and named after the then Duke of Clarence (later William IV, King of England). The new victualling yard was developed on approximately 20 hectares of land, some of which was already in use as a brewing establishment at Weevil on the west shore of Portsmouth Harbour, to the north of Gosport.

Queen Victoria regularly used Royal Clarence Yard as her disembarkation point for the short journey across the Solent to her house at Osborne in the Isle of Wight, travelling from Gosport Station on the single track line extension which had been opened in 1844 principally for this purpose.

Between the establishment of the Yard and its eventual decommissioning in the early 1990s, Royal Clarence Yard supplied provisions to the Royal Navy in all the major conflicts of this period.

In 1995, the Ministry of Defence (MoD) declared 16.26 hectares of Royal Clarence Yard surplus to requirements and released it to Gosport Borough Council. Berkeley Homes bid for the land in 1998 and was granted planning permission for a mixed use development in 2001. The south-eastern part of the Yard (approx 3,74 hectares), which includes the Oil and Pipelines Agency access to the Gosport Oil Fuel Depot, was retained by the MoD for operational reasons. In 2014, the Defence Infrastructure Organisation announced plans to release most of the rest of the retained land at Royal Clarence Yard to Gosport Borough Council.

History of the Victualling Yard 
Records dating from the early 17th Century show the area named as "Weevel Wel Spring". Later records indicate that the land had once been a farm belonging to someone named "Weovill". In the late 17th Century, a local brewer, "Captain" Henry Player, founded a brewery on the site and started supplying beer to the Royal Navy. In 1704, he built a manor house (known as Weevil House) on the site, together with gardens, a Master Brewer's house and other ancillary buildings. Henry Player died in 1711 but the brewery continued to be managed by members of his family until 1751.

Purchase of the Weevil Yard

In that year, the Weevil brewery was purchased by the Victualling Commissioners with a view to consolidating their brewing operations in Portsmouth on to a single site. The complex was soon extended: the start of the Seven Years' War prompted the Commissioners to build an additional brewhouse in 1756 to meet increased demand; and in 1766 a much larger cooperage was built (four ranges of buildings in an irregular quadrangle; these are still in place, the oldest surviving buildings in any of the victualling yards).

When Henry Player's daughter, who had continued to live in Weevil House, died in 1758, the house (together with the rest of the Weevil estate) was purchased by the Commissioners. (No new buyer could be found for the house and it was demolished in 1772). In

In 1780, the decision was taken to replace Player's original 'Great Brewhouse' with a new brewery, to be built alongside the east range of the cooperage. Construction duly took place in 1781–2 to designs by Samuel Wyatt, with Samuel Whitbread acting as a consultant on improving the brewing process. Alongside his new brewery, Wyatt built a long storehouse for storing beer in barrels (along with the dry goods used in the brewing process). Wyatt's brewery remained operational into the 19th century: in 1831 the daily shipboard issue of beer ended (to be replaced by the rum ration), but brewing still continued (albeit on a much smaller scale) until the 1850s.

Problems with the water supply to the brewery had led to John Smeaton being brought in to advise on this and on other engineering works across the Yard. In 1780 a new brewery pumphouse was installed to his design. A second pump was installed, to the same design, in 1788, adjacent to Wyatt's new brewery; this pump, converted from horse power to steam in 1860, remained in service for many years, providing water (by way of a reservoir to the north) for various uses across the site.

Rebuilding and renaming

The challenge of victualling the fleet during the Napoleonic Wars led the Victualling Board to try to consolidate its various manufacturing, storage and distribution operations in Portsmouth on to a single site (as had already been achieved at the Board's principal Yard in Deptford). At the time, it was operating from various premises, mostly in and around Old Portsmouth; these included King's Mill by the Gunwharf (purchased in 1712), a slaughterhouse near the Square Tower, and a bakery and storehouse (established in 1513) on King's Street. All were on constrained sites with limited access.

In 1824 the Victualling Board proposed transferring all these operations to the Weevil site; (they had made a similar recommendation two years earlier in respect of victualling arrangements at Plymouth, which had led to a site being adopted and adapted for the future Royal William Yard in Stonehouse). With regard to Gosport, however, the Admiralty initially resisted the idea; that it went ahead was largely thanks to its being championed by the Duke of Clarence (Lord High Admiral at the time).

By 1828 George Ledwell Taylor was engaged as architect; he was already involved in modernising Wyatt's brewery which (along with the adjacent cooperage) was to remain in place and in use as part of the new complex. (Wyatt's long storehouse was also retained, but substantially extended).

The most prominent new building on the site was a combined storehouse, granary, flour mill and bakery. Built to the north of the brewery complex, it consisted of two extended wings built either side of a central four-storey Granary (which projected out on to the edge of the quayside). The north wing was largely given over to the industrial Bakery and contained state-of-the-art machinery designed by pioneering food technologist Sir Thomas Grant. The north wing extended behind the Granary to accommodate the flour mill (where grain from the Granary was ground into flour for the Bakery); it was powered by a steam engine, located to the rear (the engine and the milling machinery were provided by Sir John Rennie). The south wing functioned as a large storehouse for (among other things) the principal product of the bakery: ship's biscuits.

Behind the south wing, a large Salt Meat Store was built, where salted meat from the nearby slaughterhouse was stored in barrels ready to be loaded on to ships. The open area behind the north wing (known as the North Meadow) was used as a lairage for livestock; the surrounding sheds and stalls originally formed part of a barracks for Military Artificers (built in 1802, before the land was acquired by the Commissioners).

Apart from the brewing, baking and butchering complexes, Taylor laid out a number of residential and administrative buildings around an open space just inside his new Main Gate (on Flagstaff Green, where Weevil House had once stood). These included a pair of large detached dwellings for the Superintendent and his deputy, smaller dwellings for other officials and, facing the gate across Flagstaff Green, the main office building topped by a small clock-tower.

On 1 July 1831 the complex was renamed the Royal Clarence Victualling Yard. By the end of 1832 work on the new Yard was all but complete. Several of its buildings have survived to the present day, as listed below.

19th-20th centuries
The Yard remained in service for the next 160 years. After on-site brewing ceased, Wyatt's brewery was converted to serve as a clothing store, while the adjacent Storehouse became a rum and sugar store. Salted meat continued to be provided to ships into the 20th century, and the Bakery appears to have remained in operation until after the First World War (whereupon it too was converted into a storehouse). Most remarkably, the Cooperage continued producing barrels, using traditional methods, until the early 1970s.

During the Second World War the Yard was kept very busy. It suffered during the Blitz with several buildings being damaged or destroyed by bombs, including the south wing of the Granary complex, the Salt Meat Store, the Main Offices, Wyatt's Brewery and the northern edge of the Cooperage. After the war new buildings were added and from 1961 the Navy's food laboratories were based there; they undertook innovative work on food production and preservation (e.g. freeze-drying).

Large volumes of provisions continued to be stored in, and distributed from, the Yard until it (along with Plymouth's Royal William Yard) was closed in 1991.

Present day 

In the late 1990s the northern part of the site was acquired by Berkeley Homes. As part of its redevelopment in the early 2000s several new buildings were constructed, the old buildings refurbished and some destroyed buildings reinstated (most notably the missing south wing of the Granary complex). The project was awarded a commendation at the 2009 Royal Town Planning Institute Awards.

The northern part of Royal Clarence Yard is now a mixed-use development open to the public including approximately 500 residential dwellings, workshops, artist galleries, cafes, restaurants, retail units and a marina (operated by Castle Marinas).

The Ministry of Defence announced its intention to dispose of the southern part of Royal Clarence Yard in 2014 but this did not happen immediately.  In June 2017, Gosport Borough Council included Royal Clarence Yard as a "Character Area" and proposals for its eventual development in a draft "Waterfront and Town Centre Supplementary Planning Document". In November 2018, the MoD put the  site up for sale, emphasizing its 'full deep-water access to Portsmouth Harbour, making it ideally suitable for commercial marine activity'. The following year the site was purchased by the South Shields-based UK Docks, with a view to redeveloping it as 'a unique specialist marine hub'.

Notable Buildings 
Royal Clarence Yard was designated a Conservation Area by Gosport Borough Council in 1990. The site  is significant due to its place in British industrial history as "one of the first large industrial food processing plants in the country" and for the quality and style of the buildings, several of which have Listed Building status.

Main Gate and Two Lodges 
The ceremonial entrance to Royal Clarence Yard, designed by George Taylor and built in 1830–31, the Main Gate and flanking Lodges are built of brick, stuccoed on the interior front, in the late Georgian style. The gate and Lodges have Grade II* Listed Building status. The Arch is topped by a double-sided painted Coad Stone Royal Crest.

Superintendent's and Deputy Superintendent's Houses; Police House, Flagstaff Green 
Adjacent to the Main Gate sit the Superintendent's and Deputy Superintendent's Houses which were designed and built in stuccoed brick by George Taylor in 1830–31 to house the Victualling Yard senior officers. Both buildings have Grade II Listed Building status.

The Police House (Residence 6) is a Grade II Listed Building designed and built by George Taylor at the same time as the Main Gate, the Lodges and the other officer's residences surrounding Flagstaff Green. Built of stuccoed brick in the late Georgian style, this building was formerly used as the residence of the Yard's Inspector of Police.

The Granary and Bakery; Flour Mill and Stores; Boiler and Engine House 
The Granary and Bakery, Flour Mill, Stores (1828–30) and the Boiler and Engine Houses (1862-3) are all late Georgian style, red-brick buildings with Grade II* Listed Building status. The Bakery on the ground floor, which retains the original large bread ovens, has been converted into a restaurant.

The Slaughterhouse 
The Slaughterhouse is an Italianate style, red-brick building with Grade II Listed Building status. It was built in 1854 following a decision to move the slaughtering facility from its former location close to the mooring for the Royal Yacht due to many complaints from the Royal Household about 'offensive effluvia' from the old slaughterhouse.

The Cooperage and the Pump House 
The Cooperage consists of single story workshops set around a large square, most of which were constructed between 1765 and 1766 next to the Weevil Brewery. Originally used for the manufacture of casks, some of the workshops were later adapted for other uses as the needs of the Navy changed.  The South, West and East Ranges are all Grade II Listed buildings. The last cooper to work at Royal Clarence Yard was Michael Whitaker, who joined as an apprentice aged 14 in 1949 and left when the Yard finally closed in 1990.

The Pump House in the Cooperage is an octagonal Grade II Listed Building built in 1778 of brick with a pyramidal louvred roof. It was originally designed to house the horse engine which pumped water from the well beneath to the Weevil Brewhouse nearby.

The Tank Store and Steam Fire Engine House 
The Tank Store is a long, Grade II Listed, 23 bay shed, originally built in 1833 with open sides. Timber-framed walls were added shortly after construction.  The store's main purpose was the "care and maintenance of ships' water storage tanks" and is the only known surviving example of a purpose-built bulk tank storage unit.  A continuous lean-to was added on the western side of the Store in 1870. The Engine House was added in 1892.

The New South Store 
Lying parallel to the Tank Store, the New South Store is a long Grade II Listed Building, parts of which date from 1758. The building was altered in 1830 (George Taylor's development of the former brewery into the new Naval Victualling Yard), remodelled again in 1897-8 and damaged during a bombardment in 1940. The building was originally used to store dry goods for the brewery and later used for storing rum and sugar.

References

Buildings and structures in Hampshire
Royal Navy shore establishments
History of the Royal Navy